The EDRA Aeronautica Super Pétrel is an amphibious pusher configuration biplane, seating two side-by-side, brought into production in Brazil in 2002 though with French parentage. It remained in production in 2011, in kit and flyaway forms.

Design and development

The design of the Super Petrel has its origins in the Tisserand Hydroplum, a single-seat, wooden amphibian intended for kit building first flown in 1983 and its two-seat, Rotax 532-powered development, the Hydroplum II, in 1986. The Société Morbihannaise d'Aéro Navigation (SMAN) acquired production rights to the latter in 1987, marketing it as the Pétrel, and passed them on to Billie Marine when SMAN ceased trading. In 2002 the Super Petrel 100 was developed by Edra Aeronautica.

By 2014 the design was being produced by Scoda Aeronáutica of Ipeúna, São Paulo, Brazil.

The Super Petrel is of mixed construction, though with much use of composite materials. The wings have tubular aluminium alloy spars combined with PVC foam ribs. The leading edges and wingtips are formed from glass fibre composite, with fabric covering elsewhere. The wings have constant chord and zero sweep, with angled winglet tips; the upper wing has the greater span, less dihedral (2° 13′ compared with 3° 26′). There is slight stagger. The Super Petrel is a single bay biplane with N-form aluminium interplane struts with an additional diagonal strut in each bay from the lower fuselage to the top of the interplane struts. The centre section is supported by a pylon or cabane which also contains the engine mounting.  Ailerons are carried only by the upper wings; there are no flaps. The wings can be disassembled in about 30 minutes for transportation by trailer.

The single-step hull is an epoxy/carbon fibre foam monocoque, with a carbon fibre boom supporting the all-composite, cruciform and wire braced tail unit. The rear control surfaces are balanced.  The cockpit is forward of the central pylon and seats two side-by-side with dual controls.  It may be flown open, with just a windscreen, or enclosed by the single piece, forward-hinged canopy. There is a baggage compartment behind the seating. The Super Petrel has a short legged tricycle undercarriage for land operation; the main units, which have hydraulic brakes, retract upwards through 90° into the sides of the hull with the wheels exposed but recessed into the underside of the lower wing. The steerable nosewheel retracts forward, leaving the tyre partly exposed as a docking fender. A pair of small, stepped floats on the lower wings below the interplane struts stabilise the aircraft on water.

The Super Petrel is powered by a 73.5 kW (98.6 hp) Rotax 912ULS flat-four engine mounted in pusher configuration on the central pylon just below the upper wing. It drives a three-blade Airplast propeller, either a fixed pitch model 175 or an electrically controlled, variable pitch model PV 50.

Operational history

Seven Super Petrel appeared on the civil aircraft registers of European countries, excluding Russia in mid-2010. There have also been sales in North America, Africa, Australia and New Zealand as well as in Brazil where there were 50 registered by December 2009.

Variants

Super Petrel 100 Designed in 2002.  Lowered engine line, revised undercarriage and controls. Structural alterations with more carbon fibre; wingtips with washout and winglets which increased the span of both wings; floats moved from tips to wing underside.
Super Petrel LS Designed in 2009. 280 mm (11 in) longer and with a 25 km/h (16 mph) increase in cruising speed; greater fuel capacity; redesigned cabin and tail group.
AAC SeaStar SP North American version marketed by Amphibian Airplanes of Canada (AAC).

Specifications (Super Petrel LS)

See also

References

External links

 Official website
 NACA 2412 airfoil

Biplanes
Single-engined pusher aircraft
Amphibious aircraft
2000s Brazilian aircraft
2000s Brazilian civil utility aircraft